

This is a list of the National Register of Historic Places listings in Grundy County, Tennessee.

This is intended to be a complete list of the properties and districts on the National Register of Historic Places in Grundy County, Tennessee, United States.  Latitude and longitude coordinates are provided for many National Register properties and districts; these locations may be seen together in a map.

There are 22 properties and districts listed on the National Register in the county.  Another 5 properties in the county were once listed, but have since been removed.

See also National Register of Historic Places listings in Marion County, Tennessee for additional properties in Monteagle, a city that spans the county line.

Current listings

|}

Former listings

|}

See also

 List of National Historic Landmarks in Tennessee
 National Register of Historic Places listings in Tennessee

References

Grundy
 
Buildings and structures in Grundy County, Tennessee